Reinier Wilhelmus "Rein" Welschen (29 August 1941 – 17 September 2013) was a Dutch politician and member of the Labour Party (PvdA).

Welschen served as an alderman of Breda from 1978 to 1987. He was a Provincial-Executive of North Brabant from 1987 to 1992. He served as the Mayor of Eindhoven from 1992 until 2003. The city experienced the bankruptcy of both the DAF Car BV and the Operation Centurion at Philips during his tenure, which increased unemployment. A major crash of a Belgian Air Force C-130 Hercules also took place on 15 July 1996. In 2004 he was acting mayor of Westland.

Rein Welschen had been in declining health for several years. He died on 17 September 2013, at the age of 72. His funeral was held in Breda, while a memorial service was held Eindhoven's city hall on 27 September 2013.

References

1941 births
2013 deaths
Aldermen in North Brabant
Labour Party (Netherlands) politicians
Mayors of Eindhoven
Mayors in South Holland
People from Westland (municipality), Netherlands
Members of the Provincial-Executive of North Brabant
Municipal councillors of Breda
People from Breda